Extra Medium Kick Ball Star (17) is the 4th album by California Punk band Fifteen. This album marked a change in theme from previous albums, with Ott addressing the abuse he grew up with in songs such as Run II, Grow Up and Emancipation Proclamation.

Track list
 Front
 Chris' Song
 Run II
 The Deal
 Grow Up
 Emancipation Proclamation
 Over and Over
 Intelligence
 Jesus
 Rainbow Connection
 Violation II

References

Fifteen (band) albums
1995 albums